Lillehammer Olympic Bobsleigh and Luge Track is a bobsleigh, luge and skeleton track located at Hunderfossen in Lillehammer, Norway,  north of the town center of Lillehammer. It was completed in 1992 for the 1994 Winter Olympics, where it hosted the bobsleigh events and luge events. It has since also hosted the FIBT World Championships 1995 in skeleton and the FIL World Luge Championships 1995, and hosted 2016 Winter Youth Olympics.

Original plans called for the track to be located at Fåberg. Later it was proposed moved to Kanthaugen in the town center and then Holmenkollen in Oslo, before Hunderfossen was decided upon. The track has been part of the proposed Oslo 2018 and 2022 Winter Olympics bids.

History
Prior to the Lillehammer Olympics, there was no bobsleigh and luge track in Norway. During the 1952 Winter Olympics in Oslo, Korketrekkeren had been built as a temporary venue, but it was made of snow and was not reused after the Olympics. In its bid for the 1994 Winter Olympics, Lillehammer had proposed placing the bobsleigh and luge track next to Balbergbakken in Fåberg. By May 1989, plans for most of the venues were being reshuffled and the track was then proposed located at Kanthaugen as part of an Olympic Park at Stampesletta. The Kanthaugen proposal was estimated to cost NOK 231 million.

Lillehammer Municipal Council, Oppland County Council and the Norwegian Directorate for Cultural Heritage rejected the location because of the environmental impact. These institutions instead proposed that the track be built at Huseskogen at Hunderfossen. The Lillehammer Olympic Organizing Committee initially disapproved of the location and in 1990 started looking at the possibility of constructing the track at Holmenkollen in Oslo. Two routes were considered, one in the same route as Korketrekkeren and one which would run from Gratishaugen at Holmenkollbakken to Midtstuen. Internationally there was support from the International Bobsleigh & Skeleton Federation and the International Luge Federation to build Norway's track in the capital. Concerns about the environmental impact of a Hunderfossen location were raised, particularly regarding visual pollution. However, Hunderfossen was confirmed along with a grant issued by the Parliament of Norway on 24 August 1990.

The designers of the tracks at Altenberg and Oberhof, East Germany, the Olympic tracks in La Plagne, France, and Calgary, Canada, were consulted during planning. Five companies bid for the concrete construction work, which was awarded to a joint venture between Aker Entreprenør and Veidekke for NOK 45 million. Also the construction of the buildings was awarded to the same group. The track was the first of the Olympic venues for the 1994 games for which construction started. After construction started, Minister of Culture Åse Kleveland (Labour Party) suggested in March 1991, in an attempt to reduce costs, that the 1994 Olympic bobsleigh and luge events be held at La Plagne, the site of the events for the 1992 Winter Olympics in Albertville. The French authorities were positive, given that Norway pay for part of the construction costs, but the idea was rejected by LOOC-president Gerhard Heiberg. Also fellow party members reacted, who emphasized that NOK 30 million had already been used on blasting the track route.

It is the first track in the world to build the cooling pipes into an underground culvert. It consists of 31 reinforced concrete sections. The concrete work was completed on 31 October 1991. Representatives for the Norwegian Society for the Conservation of Nature stated that they were satisfied with the result. It is the only artificially frozen bobsleigh and luge track in the Nordic Countries. The venue was completed on 1 October 1992 and cost NOK 201 million. After the Olympics, the ownership of the venue was transferred to Lillehammer Olympiapark, owned by Lillehammer Municipality.

Specifications
The track has 16 turns and contains 24 photocells for timekeeping. The spectator capacity is 10,000.

The facility produces 4.5 gigawatt hours per year of district heating, gaining the nickname "Norway's largest refrigerator".

The venue is operated by Lillehammer Olympiapark, which also operates the four other Olympic venues within Lillehammer, Lysgårdsbakken, Birkebeineren Ski Stadium, Håkons Hall and Kanthaugen Freestyle Arena. The track is staffed with seven employees, in addition to up to 20 more people during large events. The venue both serves local sports clubs and more than 20 nations have sledding sports training in Lillehammer. In addition the track serves up to 10,000 tourists per year; during summer rides are provided on wheeled bobsleighs. The track is operated eleven months per year. As of 2004, the venue received subsidies of between NOK 1.5 to 2.0 million per year.

The following table shows the physical statistics for the track for the various sports. It contains the competition length (start to finish, excluding braking length), the number of turns, the vertical drop and the average grade.

Events

Bobsleigh at the 1994 Winter Olympics

Both two-man and four-man were competed during the 1994 Winter Olympics. Both were contested in four heats over two days: two-man took place on 19 and 20 February, while four-man took place on 26 and 27 February.

Luge at the 1994 Winter Olympics

Luge was contested in three events at the 1994 Winter Olympics. Singles was contested over four heats in two days, while doubles was contested in two heats on one day. Men's singles took place on 13 and 14 February, women's singles took place on 15 and 16 February, and men's doubles took place on 18 February.

FIBT World Championships 1995

The FIBT World Championships 1995 was split between Altenburg and Lillehammer, with bobsleigh taking place in Altenburg and skeleton in Lillehammer. The skeleton events took place on 4 and 5 March.

FIL World Luge Championships 1995

The FIL World Luge Championships 1995 was competed between 30 nations in four events. It was the second to take place in Norway, after the inaugural 1955 edition in Oslo.

Future
Lillehammer is scheduled to host the 2016 Winter Youth Olympics, which is scheduled to take place between 12 February and 21 February. Lillehammer Olympic Bobsleigh and Luge Track is scheduled to host the bobsleigh, luge and skeleton events.

Three Norwegian cities, Tromsø, Oslo and Trondheim, announced intentions to bid for the 2018 Winter Olympics. Oslo planned a joint bid with Lillehammer and planned to use the sliding center along with the Alpine skiing hills of Hafjell and Kvitfjell in their bid. This was after the International Olympic Committee signaled that they wanted more moderation in venue construction costs and that they would prefer bid which used existing venues, even if it increased distances. This was backed by the International Luge Federation and the International Bobsleigh & Skeleton Federation, who both did not want additional tracks built in the world because of the difficulties funding their operation. The 2018 proposals were shelved, but a renewed Oslo bid process for the 2022 Olympics also calls for the use of Lillehammer.

Track records
The following is an incomplete list of track records; while including luge and women's skeleton, it excludes bobsleigh and men's skeleton. The list contains both start times and track times, as well, as the athlete and their nationality, and the date of the record.

References
Bibliography

 
 
 
 

Notes

Venues of the 1994 Winter Olympics
Venues of the 2016 Winter Youth Olympics
Olympic bobsleigh venues
Olympic luge venues
Bobsleigh, luge, and skeleton tracks
Sports venues in Norway
1992 establishments in Norway
Sports venues in Lillehammer